is a Japanese actor from Tokyo.

Personal life
Maruyama has teaching licenses for social studies (middle school level) and Japanese history (high school level).

Filmography

Television

Film

Stage
 Fūma no Kojirō (2008) - Shien
 Chotto×3=Doppelgänger (2008)
 Saiyuki Kagekiden: Go to the West (2008) - Sha Gojyo
 Saiyuki Kagekiden: Dead or Alive (2009) - Sha Gojyo
 Killer SHU ~ SHOOT ME ~ (2009) - Surfer
 Takla Makan (2010) - Haruki
 Reverse Historica (2010) - Hamasaki / Akechi Mitsuhide
 SAMURAI 7 (2010) - Hyogo
 MISSING LINK (2011) - Yamada Yasushi
 SAMURAI 7 (2012) - Hyogo
 Model's Heart (2012) - Mendou Ataru
 Nazotoki wa Dinner no Ato de (2012) - Hosoyama Teruya
 Satomi Hakkenden (2014) - Inumura Daikaku
 CURRY LIFE (2015) - Kojirou
 We're the Bounty Hunter Troupe (Stage) (2015) - Kinbara Toshirou
 KABUKI (2016) - Mikazuki
 Yami Kariudo (2016) - Sumeragi Shizuma
 Sanada Ten Braves (2016) - Yuri Kamanosuke
 Farewell We're the Bounty Hunter Troupe (Stage) (2017) - Kinbara Toshirou
 Satomi Hakkenden (2017) - Inumura Daikaku
 Picaresque Seven (2018) - Evil Secret Association Grand Leader
 Lohengrin (2018) - Lohengrin (Youth)
 Transit Comedians Sketch Collection ~ 2018 Summer ~ (2018)
 Samurai Reincarnation (2018) - Toda Godayuu

Direct-to-Video
 Zyuden Sentai Kyoryuger: It's Here! Armed On Midsummer Festival!! (2013) - Utsusemimaru / Kyoryu Gold (voice)
 Zyuden Sentai Kyoryuger Returns: Hundred Years After (2014) - Uppy / Kyoryu Violet (voice), Utsusemimaru / Kyoryu Gold (voice)

Internet
 Smell of SHOWA Niconico Channel (2017–present)
 Brave Sentai Brave Frontier (2018) - Brave of Thunder Eze
 This Is Brave! Battle Frontier (2018) - Utsusemimaru / Kyoryu Gold (voice)

Advertising
 BANDAI "Kyoryu Gold Transformation Toy Series" (2013)

References

External links
 Official blog 

Japanese male actors
1983 births
Living people
People from Tokyo